TCMI, Inc. better known by the name TCV (Technology Crossover Ventures) is an American investment firm based in Menlo Park, California. The firm mainly invests in public and private growth-stage companies in the technology industry.

Background 

TCV was founded in 1995 by Richard H. Kimball and Jay Hoag.

The firm is headquartered in Menlo Park with additional offices in New York and London.

In 2021, the firm founded TCV Acquisition, a Special-purpose acquisition company with no commercial operations. It was formed to raise capital to acquire private companies. On 14 April, it was listed on the Nasdaq under the ticker 'TCVA' and raised $350 million.

The typical size of an investment that TCV makes in companies ranges from $3 million to $300 million. As of 2020, TCV has invested over $13 billion in over 350 companies.

Funds

Notable investments 

 Altiris
 Airbnb
 ByteDance
 Dollar Shave Club
 ExactTarget
 Expedia
 Facebook
 Fandango
 Fuze
 GoDaddy
 GoFundMe
 Genesys
 HomeAway
 IQMS
 Netflix
 Open English
 Payoneer
 Peloton
 Redback Networks
 Silver Peak
 SeatGeek
 Sitecore
 Splunk
 Spotify
 Thinkorswim
 Vice Media
 Webroot
WorldRemit
 Zillow

References

External links
 www.tcv.com (Company Website)

Financial services companies established in 1995
Financial services companies based in California
Companies based in Menlo Park, California
Private equity firms of the United States
Venture capital firms of the United States